Guzmania stricta is a plant described by Lyman Bradford Smith.  It is a part of the genus Guzmania and family Bromeliaceae. It is an epiphyte.

References

stricta